The 2016 Bukit Batok by-election was concluded on 7 May 2016, with Murali Pillai from the People's Action Party as the winning candidate. This followed the sudden resignation of David Ong Kim Huat of the People's Action Party on 12 March 2016.

On 20 April, President Tony Tan issued the writ of election. On 27 April, two candidates were nominated, Murali Pillai of the People's Action Party, and Chee Soon Juan of the Singapore Democratic Party. The by-election was the 13th of its kind since Singapore's independence.

Background 
On 12 March 2016, David Ong suddenly resigned from politics as an incumbent Member of Parliament from the People's Action Party (PAP) citing "personal reasons", and having admitted on committing a "personal indiscretion", which was accepted by the party's secretary-general and Prime Minister of Singapore Lee Hsien Loong. Then-PAP Whip, Chan Chun Sing, said that the party took "very decisive action" and acted "in a very short time" once it learned of Ong's issues, due to "standards that the party also wants to uphold". Ong sent a personal letter of apology to Bukit Batok residents in early April 2016.

The explanation offered by the Singapore media revealed Ong was having an extra-marital affair with a 41-year-old PAP member and grassroots volunteer Wendy Lim. Ong's alleged affair went on over nearly six months before it went public after the husband of Lim lodging a complaint; Lim subsequently left the PAP three days later on the 15th while also going on leave with her employer Pacific Integrated Logistics. Ong is the third MP in five years to resign from his parliamentary seat and leave his political party because of an alleged extra-marital affair, after the likes of Workers Party's MP Yaw Shin Leong (which precipitated the 2012 by-election in Hougang SMC, and speaker and PAP's MP Michael Palmer (which precipitated the 2013 by-election in Punggol East SMC).

The role handling Bukit Batok SMC is tentatively taken of by incumbent Member of Parliament of Jurong Group Representation Constituency and Senior Minister of State Desmond Lee pending the result of a by-election electing a new MP. Ang Wei Neng takes over as Jurong-Clementi Town Council chairman.

Calling of by-election 
On 20 April 2016, President Tony Tan Keng Yam issued the writs of election adjourning Nominations to be held on 27 April at Keming Primary School and voting on 7 May. Singapore Prime Minister Lee Hsien Loong said that after the annual Budget Statement was passed (by the Singapore Parliament on 14 April, with President Tan announcing his assent on 15 April), Deputy Prime Minister Teo Chee Hean (performing as Acting Prime Minister while Lee was away) advised President Tony Tan to issue the writ of election.

Candidates 
Two candidates for election were nominated on 27 April 2016: Murali Pillai of the People's Action Party (PAP) and Chee Soon Juan of the Singapore Democratic Party (SDP). SDP had decided on 20 March that Chee, their party secretary-general, would run as their candidate; while PAP announced on 21 March that their candidate would be Pillai, a former PAP branch secretary of Bukit Batok who contested in Aljunied Group Representation Constituency in the 2015 general election.

Three other men had applied for political donation certificates but were not nominated as candidates:

Five opposition parties, including the PPP, had earlier ruled out contesting in the by-election. The rest were the Democratic Progressive Party, the Singapore Democratic Alliance, the Singaporeans First party, and the largest opposition party in Singapore, the Workers' Party. Samir Salim Neji, an independent candidate who contested in Bukit Batok during the 2015 general election, also announced he would not contest.

Campaigning 

Chee campaigned with a slogan of "Now Is The Time", and his campaign used technology and social media widely. By 21 April, Chee had put together a team of four to advise the SDP (in the first 100 days) on how to take over and run the town council should they win. Chee also pledged that the SDP wanted "to surpass current levels of performance of PAP-run town councils". By 29 April, the SDP had established a 13-strong transition team to ensure the SDP town council "works without a hitch, all from Day One". Chee also elaborated that he would personally manage the running of the town council instead of using managing agents, with the SDP aiming "to set new standards for transparency and accountability in town council governance."

It was reported on 23 April that the SDP had prepared four social schemes for Bukit Batok residents if Chee won. One, Hearts for Bukit Batok, where needy families would be 'adopted' and helped, including with a trust fund. Additionally, Chee said he would use part of his salary as MP to help 10 families. Two, Pathfinder, targeting youth with books, fairs, sports and subsidized tuition for the poor. Three, Dollars And Sense, a financial clinic. Four, Legal Lifeline, a clinic for legal advice.

On 24 April, Pillai revealed a plan by the PAP Jurong-Clementi Town Council to upgrade infrastructure around Blocks 140 to 149 of the SMC, which would cost $1.9 million. PAP could only carry out that specific plan if they won, with Pillai saying, "If we don't have the mandate, then we won't have the ability to carry on because we will not form the town council." In response, Chee criticized pending upgrading plans as a "knee-jerk reaction every time an election comes", and also asked for an update on the $24 million upgrading plan for Bukit Batok announced by David Ong during the 2015 general election. Pillai replied that for the 2015 $23.6 million masterplan, some projects were already "fully executed", while others "are still on-going" or are still "in the pipeline". Pillai also said the $1.9 million Neighbourhood Renewal Project is "part of" the $23.6 million masterplan. After Pillai said the $1.9 million funds would be disbursed regardless of the party of the by-election winner, Chee said that he would continue with Ong's masterplan, but also propose new additions including zebra crossings and covered walkways.

On 26 April, Pillai unveiled his manifesto focusing on the three domains of jobs, social mobility and the elderly. For the first domain, Pillai proposed a program to help the unemployed find jobs faster. For the second domain, volunteers would "inspire children from low-income families to aim high to succeed in life". For the third domain, a 'health cooperative' would be implemented to help "sandwiched families" by increasing medical literacy and subsidizing consumables for the elderly. Additionally, Pillai also proposed an "emergency button scheme" for "elderly living alone" to alert "neighbours or community volunteers" of a need for help. In the following days, Pillai revealed more plans: for the elderly, setting up a new "eldercare centre will help provide more therapy services and daycare services". He also elaborated on his initial plans: for social mobility, Pillai hoped that his volunteer youth mentorship program would eventually be accessible to all residents and be introduced in schools; while for the unemployed, Pillai is planning on "leveraging on community contacts within the pool of community volunteers and Bukit Batok residents, and also [his] own business contacts" to help residents secure jobs.

On 27 April, Chee pledged that if elected, he would be a "full-time MP"; making the comparison: "... every morning when Mr Murali wakes up, his first destination will be his office. When I wake up every morning, my first destination is Bukit Batok." In response, Pillai said, "I would always put Bukit Batok residents' needs above mine". He also replied that PAP MPs have been able to juggle being an MP with an additional "day job"; while residents could not be served by just one person and a "team approach" is needed. At the SDP's rally on April 29, several SDP speakers criticized David Ong for resigning and thus failing to serve Bukit Batok's residents. This was followed by Chee declaring that people should "leave Mr Ong alone" and not "kick a man when he's down". The next day, Chee declared he would "put a stop" to any future attack on Ong by his party members for the by-election.

On 3 May, Chee said while he thought his opponent was Pillai, "It is turning out to be everybody else except him", while Pillai was "not saying anything". This came after multiple serving ministers from the PAP had commented on or responded to Chee during the by-election. Several PAP politicians also questioned Chee's ability to perform the role of an MP when they said he had not had a "full-time job" for several years. In response, Chee said, "I've been working every single day to not just keep the SDP together but build it up, and to think and propose and write about ideas for Singapore". Some of the other PAP members had praised Pillai's character and history in Bukit Batok while questioning Chee's character and his past, resulting in Chee calling for the PAP cease its "personal attacks" and "stop the gutter politics", and instead focus on policies and issues. In contrast, Pillai did not comment on Chee's character as of May 4. His campaign strategy emphasized on house visits where Pillai could discuss his proposals with residents in depth. Finally, Pillai said that if he were elected as a Member of Parliament, he would raise the issues of tightening the criteria for receiving employment passes and fighting for higher Eldershield insurance payouts for the disabled.

On 4 May, Chee said that his party's "comparative advantage" would be evident in Parliament, where he could make a "qualitative difference", challenging ministers to "justify their positions" on issues. Chee criticized how Singaporean ministers "have not been challenged intellectually", and thus were able to make "motherhood statements and things that do not really make a lot of sense". Amongst the national issues Chee would champion discussing include the Central Provident Fund, financial assistance for the elderly, fixing and extending the progressional wage system, and retrenchment insurance. On the retrenchment insurance scheme, Chee proposed that employed workers pay a fee for inclusion into the scheme, in exchange for a staggered form of monetary support for the 18 months after retrenchment. Additionally, Chee said that Singapore needed to "pay a lot more attention" to immigrants, fearing those "not properly vetted".

Bukit Batok SMC 

As at 21 April, there are 25,727 registered voters. They account for 56% of the total resident population of Bukit Batok SMC. Approximately 96% of the resident population live in public housing.

Election rallies 
The Singapore Police Force announced on Nomination Day 27 April 2016, a list of sites available for electoral meetings. Such meetings could be held from 28 April to 5 May between 7am to 10pm. The police also announced that Speakers' Corner would not serve as an "unrestricted area" during the campaigning period. All rallies below are held between 7pm to 10pm.

Polling stations 
On 7 May 2016, which is the Polling Day for Bukit Batok By-Election 2016, 25,727 registered voters will cast their votes at the nine polling stations in Bukit Batok SMC (six at HDB void decks, one at a pavilion and two at secondary school canteens) from 8am to 8pm (SGT). After votes closed, the boxes are sealed and sent to the counting centres.

List of Polling Stations for the Bukit Batok By-Election 2016:
HDB Block 191 Void Deck, Bukit Batok West Avenue 6
Bukit View Secondary School Canteen, Bukit Batok Street 21
HDB Block 221 Void Deck, Bukit Batok East Avenue 3
HDB Block 624 Void Deck, Bukit Batok Central
HDB Block 131 Void Deck, Bukit Batok West Avenue 6
HDB Pavilion Block 105A, Bukit Batok Central
HDB Block 136 Void Deck, Bukit Batok West Avenue 6
Bukit Batok Secondary School Canteen, Bukit Batok West Avenue 8
HDB Block 176 Void Deck, Bukit Batok West Avenue 8

Overseas voters will also cast their votes 10 overseas polling stations.

Results 

The results was announced by returning officer Ng Wai Choong at 11.27 pm (SGT) that PAP candidate Pillai was named the candidate-elect with 61.21% of the votes, beating SDP Chee's 38.79%.

The overseas votes were complied four days later on the 11th that 32 voters out of the 52 overseas votes had cast. Pillai and Chee received an additional 24 and 8 votes respectively.

Sample count 
Similar to the 2015 general election, sample counts were released by the Elections Department prior to the announcement of the official results to prevent unnecessary speculation and reliance on unofficial sources of information while counting is still under way. The sample count results were released at 9:24pm, with Pillai garnering 61% of the vote and Chee with 39%.

References 

Singapore
By-election
2016
May 2016 events in Asia